Wells is an unincorporated community in Lowndes County, Mississippi.

According to the United States Geological Survey, a variant name is Marx.

References

Unincorporated communities in Lowndes County, Mississippi
Unincorporated communities in Mississippi